William Joe Varga (January 10, 1919 – January 11, 2013), billed as Count Billy Varga, was an American professional wrestler and actor.  He was born to Rose and Joe Varga; his father was a professional wrestler in Europe known as Count Joseph Varga and taught his son wrestling at the age of five. He attended Hollywood High School and graduated from the University of Southern California. Varga won the world's light-heavyweight title in 1941 and later joined the Navy until he arrived home in 1947. Varga's wrestling career began to fall apart in the 1970s as he was busy in television and movie work.

Personal life
Varga married Rosabelle Varga who died in 1992. He resided in Northridge, California. He had three sons, Billy, Courtland and Royce, all of whom preceded him in death, and five grandchildren. He suffered from Alzheimer's disease by the beginning of 2005 and died in 2013.

Filmography

Championships and accomplishments 
50th State Big Time Wrestling
NWA Hawaii Heavyweight Championship (1 time)
NWA Hawaii Tag Team Championship (1 time) - with Sam Steamboat
NWA Hollywood Wrestling
NWA International Television Tag Team Championship (3 times) - with Hardy Kruskamp (2 times) and Mario LaPentero (1 time)

References

External links 
 
 RIP: Count Billy Varga at Cauliflower Alley Club
 

1919 births
2013 deaths
20th-century professional wrestlers
American male film actors
American male television actors
American male professional wrestlers
People associated with physical culture
Professional wrestlers from Ohio
Sportspeople from Cleveland
Stampede Wrestling alumni
University of Southern California alumni